Daria Tykhova (born 15 February 1986) is a Ukrainian sports shooter. She competed at the 2008 and 2012 Summer Olympics. She is a two-time European Championships medallist. At the 2022 World Championships, she won together with Serhiy Kulish a silver medal in mixed team 50 m rifle prone.

References

External links
 

1986 births
Living people
Ukrainian female sport shooters
Olympic shooters of Ukraine
Shooters at the 2008 Summer Olympics
Shooters at the 2012 Summer Olympics
Sportspeople from Kherson
21st-century Ukrainian women